Mirella Amato is a trilingual beer consultant, beer sommelier, and author based in Toronto, Ontario, a foremost specialist on Beer in Canada. She was the first woman in Canada to become a Certified Cicerone and, in 2012, became the first non-US resident to earn the Master Cicerone® certification. Amato is one of very few judges in the Beer Judge Certification Program in Canada to have reached the National Level of certification. She is also the recipient of the 2012 Ontario Craft Brewers Centre of Excellence Industry Choice Award in Food & Beer Matching Development and in 2018 she was inducted into the Belgian brewers' Guild as an Honorary Knight of the Brewer's Paddle.

In 2008, Amato founded Beerology, a company through which she offers craft beer and sensory consulting services. Amato is the co-founder of the Toronto-based cask ale advocacy group Cask!. She is also the founder of the Toronto Chapters of the women-only international beer-appreciation society, Barley's Angels  as well as its professional counterpart, the Pink Boots Society.

Amato has appeared on CBC Radio, Radio Canada, History Television, CityTV's Breakfast Television and Canada.com She also contributed a number of entries to the Oxford Companions to Beer. Her first book, Beerology: Everything You Need to Know to Enjoy Beer...Even More, published by Appetite  by Random House, was released on May 27, 2014 and has been translated into French and German.

References

External links
 Official site

Year of birth missing (living people)
Place of birth missing (living people)
Living people
Women in brewing
Canadian consultants
Writers from Toronto